Fabio da Conceicao Amorim (born February 28, 1990) is a Brazilian football player.

Playing career
Amorim played for J1 League club; Shonan Bellmare in 2015 season.

References

External links

1990 births
Living people
Brazilian footballers
Brazilian expatriate footballers
Expatriate footballers in Japan
J1 League players
Shonan Bellmare players
Association football forwards